Augustus William Magee (also McGee); (1789 – February 6, 1813) was a U.S. Army lieutenant and later a military filibuster who led the Gutiérrez–Magee Expedition into Spanish Texas in 1812.

Early life and military career
Augustus Magee was born in Boston, Massachusetts.  In 1809, he graduated third in his class at West Point.  Magee served as an artillery officer under Major General James Wilkinson at Baton Rouge, Louisiana, and then at Fort Jesup under future president Zachary Taylor.  He was effective but harsh in his treatment of settlers and outlaws, in the disputed Neutral Ground between the Arroyo Hondo and the Sabine River.  Magee was recommended for promotion to a higher rank, but refused the promotion.

Frustrated with his prospects in the army, he considered Bernardo Gutiérrez de Lara's plan to support the Mexican War of Independence via an invasion of Spanish Texas from American soil, even though this proposal defied the Neutrality Act.  Magee resigned his army commission in June 1812 and personally recruited many of the soldiers for a military filibustering expedition, taking the rank of colonel alongside Gutiérrez.

Filibuster
Leaving Natchitoches with 130 men on August 2, 1812, the group crossed the Sabine six days later. On August 10, Magee was joined by General Gutiérrez; on the 16th, the force entered Nacogdoches.  The army, now swollen to about 300 soldiers, occupied Santísima Trinidad de Salcedo (now Trinidad, Texas) on the Trinity River, in mid-September.  It was here that Magee became ill.  Some sources attribute this to consumption or malaria, but the papers of Mirabeau Lamar preserve the Texan rumor that Magee was poisoned by his own men, many of whom were among those he had previously mistreated during his former command.

Even though very ill, Magee remained in nominal military command.  He died while under siege at the Presidio Nuestra Señora de Loreto de la Bahía in what is now Goliad, Texas, and was succeeded as commander of the expedition by Samuel Kemper, who successfully ended the siege by the Royalists the following month.

See also
 Casas Revolt

References

Sources
 
 Davis, William C. The Pirates Laffite and The Treacherous World of the Corsairs of the Gulf. New York: Harcourt, 2005. p. 141.
 Lamar, Mirabeau. "Information from Capt. Gaines." 1835. Retrieved 13 February 2010.
 

1789 births
1813 deaths
People of Spanish Texas
American filibusters (military)